Caroline Dukes  (May 19, 1929 – June 8, 2003) was a painter and installation artist, born in Hungary but moved to Winnipeg, Manitoba in 1967. Today, she is considered a Manitoba artist.

Career
Dukes was born in Ujpest, Hungary and apprenticed with sculptor, Zsigmond Kisfaludi Strobl in 1948 while taking night classes at the Free University. In 1952, she enrolled at the Academy of Fine Arts in Budapest (Hungarian University of Fine Arts). In 1958, after a defeat of the Hungarian uprising against communism (1956), her family immigrated to Toronto. She moved to Winnipeg in 1967 and resumed her studies at the School of Art, University of Manitoba in 1968, studying with Ivan Eyre, and graduating in 1972.

Dukes' paintings were influenced by her experiences as a holocaust survivor and as a witness to communist cruelty in Hungary. Her  paintings were organized in series: Nudes (early 1970s); Interiors; Landscapes; At the Focus of Forces (1989); Buildings (1991) (shown at Budapest's Vasarely Múzeum (1993)); and Cities (1998). She created her most moving work Remember...Relate...Retell (multimedia work that included drawings, photographs, text, ready-made objects, video, audio, and constructions) in 1992, undergoing hypnosis to be able to recall memories of her own childhood and connections to her father, whose death when she was four and then recent death of her mother were catalysts in the making of the work. The exhibition was shown at the Robert McLaughlin Gallery, Oshawa, Ontario; MacKenzie Art Gallery, Regina, Saskatchewan; and at Plug In Inc. Gallery, Winnipeg, Manitoba.

Dukes showed her work in exhibitions across Canada and abroad, including group shows in Jerusalem, Munich and Barcelona. Her work is represented in major collections world-wide including the Budapest Museum of Fine Art, Montreal Museum of Fine Arts, Canada Council Art Bank, Manitoba Arts Council Art Bank, The Bronfman Collection and the Princess Anne Collection. In 1994, she was elected to the Royal Canadian Academy of Arts.	

In 1995 she became a founding member of SITE Gallery, Winnipeg’s first artist-run commercial cooperative exhibition space (1995-2005) and in April 2003, two months before her death of cancer, she completed an autobiographical work called Circus. She died in Winnipeg on June 8, 2003.

Legacy
In  2003, the Manitoba Artists for Women Art established the Caroline Dukes Legacy Fund which is administered by the Winnipeg Foundation. She was honoured posthumously with a 2008 solo retrospective titled Caroline Dukes: concealed memories at the Winnipeg Art Gallery with a catalogue by Elizabeth Legge. In 2016, the University of Manitoba School of Art had a Dukes show titled Caroline Dukes: Being There.

References

Bibliography

1929 births
2003 deaths
20th-century Canadian painters
Canadian installation artists
21st-century Canadian painters
Jewish Canadian artists
Jewish painters
Hungarian emigrants to Canada
Artists from Winnipeg
Canadian women painters
University of Winnipeg alumni
20th-century Canadian women artists
21st-century Canadian women artists
Members of the Royal Canadian Academy of Arts